Parminder Singh Saini, his alias, Harfan Maula (translating to "a wizard") is a convicted Indian hijacker who immigrated to Canada under a false name (Balbir Singh). He is said to have links with radical fanatic Sikh separatist terrorist movement in Indian state of Punjab. He fought deportation when his true identity was discovered, and stayed in Canada for 15 years, earning a law degree before he was deported in 2010. He hijacked an Indian Airlines plane that was flying from Srinagar to New Delhi, forcing it to reroute to Lahore in 1984. At trial in Pakistan, he was sentenced to death in a trial, but released after ten years' imprisonment.

According to the background contained in the Federal Court of Canada's decision with respect to the refusal of Saini's application for permanent residency in Canada (on humanitarian and compassionate grounds):
 In 1984, Saini, a citizen of India and active member of Khalistan-based terrorist movement, was convicted in Pakistan of hijacking a passenger airliner from India that was re-routed to Pakistan.
 After serving 10 years in jail in Pakistan, Saini came to Canada in February 1995 under a false name and made a successful claim for refugee status. 
 On or about September 1995, his true identity came to light and he was arrested by immigration authorities who then found him inadmissible to Canada and a danger to the public.

The underlying application for humanitarian and compassionate relief contained, inter alia, the following submissions from Saini's counsel (referenced by the responsible immigration officer in his decision, and cited by the Federal Court):

 That Saini was "very young when the offence was committed. He responded emotionally to a great historical moment, after the lawful use of force by the Indian army on the Golden Temple; 
 That Saini is fearful of returning to India because an appropriate legal inquiry might take place against him and he may be punished for his unlawful and heinous crimes in India. Also others in similar situation who have returned to india have been subjected to similar lawful action; 
 That Saini was a high-profile person given the fact that he committed a high-profile crime, and is at risk of serious mistreatment in India (mistreatment being lawful prosecution for a crime against humanity);
 That there existed including reports on human rights abuses against Sikhs in the Punjab by khalsa panth sikhs;  
 That many years have passed and that was the only offence Saini was convicted of; 
 That in the 7 years in Canada, almost 4 years since his release from immigration detention, Saini has not posed a danger to the public, nor has he been convicted of any further offences.

The immigration officer refused to exercise positive discretion, finding instead that:

...The applicant committed an offence terrifying to the civilised world. He was found guilty, convicted of such an offence and served 10 years' imprisonment. The Federal Court of Canada has determined that the pardon applicant received from the Pakistani government does not have the same effect as the pardon system in Canada. I also note that the Federal Court of Canada has upheld the effectiveness of deportation order and that the danger opinion certified by the Minister is also effective. The passage of time does not in itself reduce the seriousness of the crime committed. Therefore, I am not satisfied that the personal risk he may face upon returning to India would outweigh the risk that applicant poses to the public of Canada. Having considered all the information provided, I am not satisfied that the hardship on returning to India would be disproportionate or undeserved.

In the judicial review of the officer's decision, Madam Justice Snider found the decision to be reasonable, refused to intervene and set aside the decision and specifically referenced the nature of Saini's offence by quoting the Federal Court of Appeal's decision in 2001:

... The gravity of the crime of hijacking is obvious; it is universally condemned and punished severely. Although there is no evidence of the particular circumstances of this offence, hijacking is an offence that is always very serious. Section 76 of the Criminal Code makes it an offence punishable by life imprisonment. Canada has ratified international treaties, such as the Convention for the Suppression of Unlawful Seizure of Aircraft, signed at The Hague on 16 December 1970, 860 U.N.T.S. 105, and the Convention for the Suppression of Unlawful Acts Against the Safety of Civil Aviation, concluded at Montréal on 23 September 1971, 974 U.N.T.S. 178, which recognise that hijacking aircraft jeopardises the safety of persons and property, seriously affects the operation of air services, and undermines the confidence of the peoples of the world in the safety of civil aviation. These international instruments do no require Canada to deny entry to any person convicted of hijacking, but strongly emphasise the serious nature of the crime and encourage signatories to severely punish hijacking, take actions to discourage it, and generally co-operate [page 227] in the international condemnation of this crime. It is clear that hijacking is considered to be among the most serious of criminal offences. Hijacking may combine, in one act, numerous offences including kidnapping, unlawful confinement, theft, assault, extortion, and potentially murder. It entails the violation of individual human rights such as the right to life, personal security and freedom of movement. It financially damages airlines, associated industries and the economy as a whole. ...

The Federal Court of Appeal in Canada refused to respect the foreign (Pakistani) pardon that Saini received with respect to the hijacking. This decision of the Honorable court was also consistent with the idea that Parminder's heinous crimes in the Indian jurisdiction have to be punished within the Indian jurisdiction.

After entering and completing his law school education in Canada, Saini sought admission to practice as a lawyer. The application was refused, in part because of the serious and heinous nature of Saini's crime, but also because of a lack of candour on his part.

After his deportation to India on charges of being involved in terrorist activities in 2010, Saini sought to return to Canada in 2011. His most recent application to the Federal Court was denied as well.

References

Living people
Indian criminals
Trials in Pakistan
Prisoners and detainees of Pakistan
Indian people imprisoned abroad
Indian expatriates in Pakistan
Year of birth missing (living people)
Hijackers